Actéon may refer to:

The French name for Actaeon, a Theban hero in Greek mythology
Actéon (opera), a 1684 opera by Marc-Antoine Charpentier
, a French Navy submarine commissioned in 1931 and sunk in 1942

See also

Actaeon (disambiguation)